Come In, Stranger may refer to:

 "Come In, Stranger" (song), a 1958 Johnny Cash song
 "Come In, Stranger" (Desperate Housewives), an episode of the television series Desperate Housewives